Mohamed Alaa Hashem (born 23 January 1988) is an Egyptian handball player for Aviation SC and the Egyptian national team.

References

1988 births
Living people
Egyptian male handball players
Handball players at the 2016 Summer Olympics
Olympic handball players of Egypt
African Games gold medalists for Egypt
African Games medalists in handball
Competitors at the 2011 All-Africa Games
21st-century Egyptian people